Stanley Salmons (born 1939) is a British academic and scientist. A Professor Emeritus of Medical Cell Biology at Liverpool University, he is known for his pioneering research in the neurology, biochemistry and physiology of skeletal muscle. In 1967 he designed the first implantable neuromuscular stimulator and in 1969 he "was the first to introduce the design of the buckle-type transducer for recording directly in vivo tendon forces in animals." His 1976 work with the implanted electrical "pacemakers" on rabbit muscles (published in Nature) clarified the relationship between nerve signals and muscle chemistry and established the adaptive nature of skeletal muscle.

Life and career
Salmons was born in Lower Clapton, east London, and was educated at St. Marylebone Grammar School. He was awarded a Royal Scholarship to attend the Imperial College in London, from which he graduated in physics and went on to gain a D.I.C. in Electronics and Communications. Salmons later attended the University College London on a Nuffield Foundation bursary, where he graduated with a master's degree in physiology. He was then appointed to a research fellowship in the Department of Anatomy, University of Birmingham, where he subsequently held a Stothert Research Fellowship of the Royal Society. He also worked for a time in the Department of Physiology at Harvard Medical School.

He was a senior lecturer when he left Birmingham University for the University of Liverpool, where he was professor of medical cell biology from  1987 until 1996 and is now a professor emeritus. Salmons gave the 1989 Erasmus Wilson Demonstration at the Royal College of Surgeons of England, and has also served as  Director of the British Heart Foundation Skeletal Muscle Assist Research Group.  He is a fellow of the Institute of Physics and Engineering in Medicine and of the Anatomical Society and was a former president of the International Society on Biotelemetry. He helped found the International Functional Electrical Stimulation Society and is an honorary member of the board of directors for Deutsche Gesellschaft für Elektrostimulation und Elektrotherapie.

Salmons has written over 200 scientific articles and 12 scientific books, as well as more than 40 short stories and 17 novels.

Bibliography (selective)

Fiction
A Bit of Irish Mist, 2005.
Footprints in the Ash, 2008, 2nd ed 2015.
NH3, 2013.
The Man in Two Bodies, 2014.
The Domino Man, 2015.
The Canterpurry Tales, 2014, 2nd ed 2017.
The Tomb and other stories, Kindle 2015
Counterfeit, 2016
The Reich Legacy, 2017
Saturn Run, 2017
Mars Run, 2018
Jupiter Run, 2018
Vendetta, 2018
Cell Line, 2019
Red Nebula, 2019
Rogue Gene, 2020
"Blue on Blue", 2020
"The Girl in the Silver Spacesuit", 2021
"War & Purrs", 2022
"The Gold of Nubia", 2022
"Escape from Death Row", 2022

Most cited peer-reviewed articles

S Salmons "An implantable muscle stimulator" 1967 Journal of Physiology 1967, Volume 188, pp 13–14P.
S Salmons, J Henriksson "The adaptive response of skeletal muscle to increased use" Muscle and Nerve 1981, Volume 4, Issue 2, pp 94–105 (cited 661 times in Google Scholar as of September 2014)
S Salmons, FA Sreter "Significance of impulse activity in the transformation of skeletal muscle type" Nature 1976,  Volume 263, Issue 5572, pp 30–34 (cited 586 times in Google Scholar as of September 2014)
Brenda R. Eisenberg, Stanley Salmons "The reorganization of subcellular structure in muscle undergoing fast-to-slow type transformation" Cell and Tissue Research October 1981, Volume 220, Issue 3, pp 449–471 (cited 195 times in Google Scholar as of January 2013) 
WE Brown, S Salmons, RG Whalen "The sequential replacement of myosin subunit isoforms during muscle type transformation induced by long term electrical stimulation" Journal of Biological Chemistry 1983, Volume 258, Issue 23, pp 14686–14692
J. Henriksson, M. M. Chi, C. S. Hintz, D. A. Young, K. K. Kaiser, S. Salmons, and O. H. Lowry "Chronic stimulation of mammalian muscle: changes in enzymes of six metabolic pathways" American Journal of Physiology: Cell Physiology.  October 1, 1986 vol. 251 no. 4 C614-C632 (cited 186 times in Google Scholar as of January 2013)  
Acker MA, Hammond RL, Mannion JD, Salmons S, Stephenson LW "Skeletal muscle as the potential power source for a cardiovascular pump: assessment in vivo" Science 1987, 236(4799):324-327 
R.S. Williams, S. Salmons, E.A. Newsholme, R.E. Kaufman, and J. Mellor (1986) "Regulation of nuclear and mitochondrial expression by contractile activity in skeletal muscle." Journal of Biological Chemistry vol. 261, pp 376–80
S. Salmons, "Cardiac assistance from skeletal muscle: a reappraisal." European Journal of Cardiothoracic Surgery 2008, Vol. 35, pp 204–13
S. Salmons "Adaptive change in electrically stimulated muscle: a framework for the design of clinical protocols (Invited review)." Muscle and Nerve 2009, Volume 40, Issue 6, pp 918–935
S. Salmons "The adaptive response of skeletal muscle: what is the evidence?" Muscle & Nerve 2018, Volume 57, pp 531–41
H Kern, S Salmons, W Mayr, K Rossini, U Carraro "Recovery of long-term denervated human muscles induced by electrical stimulation." Muscle & Nerve 2005, Volume 31, pp 98-101

References

External links
 Stanley Salmons' official website
  Stanley Salmons on  Medlar Press
 Kolata, Gina (23 June 2002). "Weights Build Muscles, But Not the Manly Kind". New York Times

People from Lower Clapton
Harvard Medical School faculty
1939 births
Living people
Alumni of the University of Birmingham